Karen Green is an Australian philosopher and Associate Professor of Philosophy at the University of Melbourne. She is known for her works on women's intellectual history.
Green is the president of the Australasian Association of Philosophy and a Fellow of the Australian Academy of the Humanities (elected in 2009).

Books
 A History of Women’s Political Thought in Europe 1700–1800 (Cambridge University Press, 2014)
 A History of Women’s Political Thought in Europe 1400–1700, with Jacqueline Broad (Cambridge University Press, 2009)
 Dummett: Philosophy of Language (Polity, 2001)
 The Woman of Reason (Polity, 1995)

References

External links
 Karen Green at The University of Melbourne
 
 

Australian philosophers
Continental philosophers
Analytic philosophers
Political philosophers
Philosophy academics
Living people
Australian women philosophers
Year of birth missing (living people)
University of Sydney alumni
Academic staff of the University of Melbourne
Alumni of the University of Oxford
Monash University alumni
Fellows of the Australian Academy of the Humanities